Rosellen Brown (born May 12, 1939) is an American author, and has been an instructor of English and creative writing at several universities, including the School of the Art Institute of Chicago and the University of Houston. She has won several grants and awards for her work, including the Janet Heidinger Kafka Prize. The 1996 film Before and After was adapted from her novel of the same name.

Early life
Brown was born in Philadelphia, Pennsylvania. She received a bachelor of arts degree from Barnard College in 1960 and  Brandeis University.

Bibliography
Some Deaths in the Delta and Other Poems, 1970
Whole World Catalog, Teachers and Writers Collaborative, 1972 (co-editor)
Street Games (stories), 1974; 1991
The Autobiography of My Mother (novel), 1976
Cora Fry (poems), 1977
Cora Fry's Pillow Book (poems),1994
Tender Mercies (novel), 1978
The Secret Garden (play adaptation of the novel), 1983
Civil Wars (novel), 1984
Before and After, 1992
A Rosellen Brown Reader: Selected Poetry and Prose, 1992
Inter-Office (short story), 1994
Cora Fry's Pillow Book (poetry), 1994
Half a Heart (novel), 2000
The Lake on Fire (novel), 2018

TV adaptation
Half A Heart: Based on Rosellen Brown's book of the same name which traces the lives of several people who participated in the civil rights movement and continue to live in its shadow.

Film
Before and After was released as a film of the same name in 1996. Starring Liam Neeson and Meryl Streep, it was directed by Barbet Schroeder from a screenplay by Ted Tally.

See also
 History of the Jews in Houston

References

External links
Annotation of Tender Mercies at the NYU Literature, Arts, and Medicine Database with link to text and audio of author's commentary and reading.

1939 births
Living people
Writing teachers
Art Institute of Chicago
Barnard College alumni
Brandeis University alumni
University of Houston faculty
20th-century American novelists
21st-century American novelists
American women novelists
20th-century American women writers
21st-century American women writers
Writers from Philadelphia
Novelists from Texas